Copthorne may refer to:

Place names 

 Copthorne, Cheshire, England 
 Copthorne, Cornwall 
 Copthorne, Shropshire, England 
 Copthorne, West Sussex, England 
 Copthorne Hundred in Surrey, England

Companies 

 Millennium & Copthorne Hotels, a division of City Developments Limited